Nitratireductor aquibiodomus is a Gram-negative, rod-shaped bacteria from the genus of Nitratireductor which was isolated from a marine denitrification system in Canada.

References

External links
Type strain of Nitratireductor aquibiodomus at BacDive -  the Bacterial Diversity Metadatabase

Phyllobacteriaceae
Bacteria described in 2004